Patrick Lebreton (born 6 September 1963) was a member of the National Assembly of France from 2007 to 2017, representing the island of Réunion's
4th constituency,  as a member of the Socialiste, radical, citoyen et divers gauche.

References

1963 births
Living people
Socialist Party (France) politicians
Mayors of places in Réunion
Deputies of the 13th National Assembly of the French Fifth Republic
Deputies of the 14th National Assembly of the French Fifth Republic
Members of Parliament for Réunion